Dario Cataldo (born 17 March 1985) is an Italian professional road bicycle racer, who currently rides for UCI WorldTeam .

Career

Liquigas (2007–08)

In January 2007, Cataldo was hit by a car while training and broke his right wrist. Later that year, Cataldo won two stages in the Tour de l'Avenir. After a disappointing year in 2008,  did not renew his contract.

Quick Step (2009–12)
In 2009, Cataldo switched to the  team. For his first two years, Cataldo failed to make a huge impact however in 2012, he began to reach his potential. Cataldo won the 2012 Italian National Time Trial Championships and finished in 12th place at the Giro d'Italia. He escaped with Thomas De Gendt of the  squad early in the race and they were never caught. He managed to lift his arms for a second as he crossed the line for the 'victory pose' before slumping over his handlebars with fatigue.

Team Sky (2013–14)

His success in 2012 saw him earn a move to UCI World Tour champions , where he was expected to play the role of a super-domestique for either Bradley Wiggins at the Giro d'Italia or Chris Froome at the Tour de France.

In October 2014  announced they had signed Cataldo for the 2015 season, with the team's general manager Alexander Vinokourov describing his role as being a climbing lieutenant for Vincenzo Nibali and Fabio Aru, as well as contributing to the team's performance in team time trials.

Astana (2015–19)
In June 2017, he was named in the startlist for the 2017 Tour de France. His tour ended when he withdrew due to injury on 12 July, caused by a crash in the feed zone.

Major results

2006
 1st  Overall Girobio
2007
 1st Stage 1 (TTT) Settimana Ciclistica Lombarda
 3rd Rund um den Henninger Turm
 4th Giro del Veneto
 10th Overall Tour de l'Avenir
1st Points classification
1st Mountains classification
1st Stages 2 & 7
 10th Coppa Ugo Agostoni
2008
 1st Stage 1b (TTT) Settimana Internazionale di Coppi e Bartali
2009
 4th Overall Tour of Missouri
 5th Gran Premio Bruno Beghelli
 5th Coppa Lella Mentasti – GP Città di Stresa
2010
 1st Gran Premio Bruno Beghelli
 2nd Time trial, National Road Championships
2011
 7th Trofeo Magalluf-Palmanova
 9th Overall Tour of Beijing
2012
 1st  Time trial, National Road Championships
 1st Stage 16 Vuelta a España
 1st Stage 2b (TTT) Tour de l'Ain
 9th Overall Volta a Catalunya
2013
 1st Stage 2 (TTT) Giro d'Italia
 1st Stage 1b (TTT) Giro del Trentino
2014
 2nd Time trial, National Road Championships
 2nd Overall Settimana Internazionale di Coppi e Bartali
1st Stages 1b (TTT) & 4 (ITT)
2015
 4th Overall Giro del Trentino
2016
 1st Stage 2 (TTT) Vuelta a Burgos
 8th Vuelta a Murcia
 9th Overall Tour de Pologne
2017
 4th Time trial, National Road Championships
2018
 1st  Mountains classification Critérium du Dauphiné
 3rd Overall Tour of Austria
2019
 1st Stage 15 Giro d'Italia
 1st Stage 1 (TTT) Vuelta a España
 8th Overall Tour of the Alps

Grand Tour general classification results timeline

References

External links

 Dario Cataldo profile at Team Sky
 Dario Cataldo profile at Cycling Base

 

Italian male cyclists
1985 births
Living people
People from Lanciano
Italian Vuelta a España stage winners
Italian Giro d'Italia stage winners
Cyclists from Abruzzo
European Games competitors for Italy
Cyclists at the 2015 European Games
Cyclists at the 2019 European Games
Sportspeople from the Province of Chieti